Who Knows Where the Time Goes? is the twentieth studio album released in 1997 by folk rock band Fairport Convention. It is a mixture of studio and live tracks recorded by Mark Tucker at Woodworm Studios, Oxfordshire, The Cropredy Festival 1995 and the Fairport Convention Winter Tour 1997. It was Fairport Convention's first studio album with singer and violinist Chris Leslie, who replaced Maartin Allcock and would become a mainstay in the band.

The cover photograph was taken at Barford St. Michael Post Office, Oxfordshire.

Track listing 
 "John Gaudie" (Chris Leslie) 5:05
 "Sailing Boat" (Anna Ryder) 5:25
 "Here's to Tom Paine" (Steve Tilston) 5:14
 "The Bowman's Retreat" (Ric Sanders) 3:02
 "Spanish Main" (Martin Allcock, Chris Leslie) 4:28
 "The Golden Glove" (Traditional lyric; tune Sally Barker) 6:04
 "Slipology" (Ric Sanders) 3:00
 "Wishfulness Waltz" (Alan Franks)/"Moonlight On The Water" (Benny Thomasson) 5:42
 "Life's a Long Song" (Ian Anderson) 2:35
 "Dangerous" (Kristina Olsen) 4:38
 "I Heard It Through the Grapevine" (Norman Whitfield, Barrett Strong) 3:50
 "Who Knows Where the Time Goes?" (Sandy Denny) 6:31

Personnel
Fairport Convention
 Simon Nicol guitar, vocals
 Dave Pegg bass guitar, vocals
 Dave Mattacks drums, glockenspiel, keyboards
 Ric Sanders violin
 Chris Leslie mandolin, violin, vocals, bouzouki, guitar

Additional personnel
 Helen Miller trombone
 Sharron Naylor background vocals
 Richard Thompson guitars
 Roy Wood instrumentation
 John Dent mastering
 Mark Tucker recording, production & mixing
 Andy Price design

Release history
1997, June : Woodworm Records  UK CD, WRCD025
1998, March : Folkprint, UK limited edition LP, FP 005 PLP, with slightly different track list
2000 : Mooncrest Records, as Wishfulness Waltz, CRESTCD 048Z / CRESTCD 048, UK reissue with alternate packaging and bonus live tracks

References

1998 albums
Fairport Convention albums